WtFOCK (stylised as wtFOCK) is a Belgian teen drama web series broadcast by VIER and VIJF that follows the lives of teenagers in Antwerp. It is an adaption of the popular Norwegian series SKAM. By the end of the first series, around 100,000 people were watching wtFOCK every week.

Characters
The following is a list of the wtFOCK cast, including only the cast and characters who appear in at least three episodes. Recurring characters are highlighted in red and the main character of each series in green.

Seasons

Season 1
Season 1 aired from 1 October to 21 December 2018 and comprised 12 episodes. Jana Ackermans is the central character and the season focuses on her relationship with her boyfriend Jens as well as themes of loneliness, identity and friendship.

Season 2
Season 2 aired from 22 April to 28 June 2019 and comprised 10 episodes. Zoë Loockx is the central character and the season focuses on her relationship with Senne, a popular boy at school, and themes of friendship, self-image and sexual abuse.

Season 3
Season 3 aired from 12 October to 20 December 2019 and comprised 10 episodes. Robbe IJzermans is the central character and the season focuses on his coming out as gay and his relationship with Sander, who struggles with bipolar disorder. It also deals with themes of sexual identity, homosexuality and mental health. Clips from Season 3 were viewed ten million times within seven weeks of the series starting.

wtFOCKDOWN
Due to the COVID-19 pandemic, filming for the fourth season was halted. wtFOCKDOWN was a way to continue filming while social distancing. Starting on 1 April 2020, it follows the lives of the characters while in lockdown through video calls and messages. wtFOCKDOWN clips have been viewed over 2 million times as of May 2020.

Season 4
Season 4 aired from 29 August to 7 November 2020. The series diverged from the original SKAM storyline with a new character, Kato Fransen. The storyline deals with social media, racism, self-harm, drugs, and COVID-19.

Season 5
Season 5 started airing on 19 April 2021. Yasmina Ait Omar is the central character, with the series focusing on ideas of faith and religion, being Muslim in Belgium, and the holy month of Ramadan.

References

2010s Belgian television series
2020s Belgian television series
2010s LGBT-related drama television series
2010s teen drama television series
2020s teen drama television series
2018 Belgian television series debuts
Islam in fiction
Belgian drama television shows
Dutch-language television shows
Television series about teenagers
Television shows set in Belgium
Play4 (TV channel) original programming